Kosmos 440 ( meaning Cosmos 440), also known as DS-P1-I No.10 was a satellite which was used as a radar target for anti-ballistic missile tests. It was launched by the Soviet Union in 1971 as part of the Dnepropetrovsk Sputnik programme.

Launch 
It was launched aboard a Kosmos-2I 63SM rocket, from Site 133/1 at Plesetsk. The launch occurred at 10:30:00 UTC on 24 September 1971.

Orbit 
It decayed from orbit on 29 October 1972.

Kosmos 440 was the eleventh of nineteen DS-P1-I satellites to be launched. Of these, all reached orbit successfully except the seventh.

See also

 1971 in spaceflight

References

1971 in spaceflight
Kosmos 0440
1971 in the Soviet Union
Spacecraft launched in 1971
Dnepropetrovsk Sputnik program